Oud-Turnhout is a municipality located in the Belgian province of Antwerp. The municipality only comprises the town of Oud-Turnhout proper. In 2021, Oud-Turnhout had a total population of 14,201. The total area is 38.80 km².

There are 3 parishes: Zwaneven in the east, St. Bavo in the centre and Oosthoven in the North. Zwaneven is in the upmarket residential area referred to as "De Lint", where many Dutch people live.

History 
The village was first mentioned in 1333 as "Vetus Turnoltum". Oud (old) has been added to distinguish from the village which developed around the castle which was built in 1109 or 1110. That village would eventually become the city of Turnhout. Oud-Turnhout used to be part of the municipality of Turnhout, but felt neglected by its bigger neighbour. In 1859, Oud-Turnhout became an independent municipality. In 1977, the hamlets of Schoonbroek en Kinschot became part of Retie, the area Kijkverdriet was awarded to Ravels, and the remainder became part of Ravels.

Attractions

Notable people
 Margriet Hermans, politician and singer
 Micha Marah Belgian singer and actress, was born in Oud-turnhout
 Leo Proost, Belgian cyclist, was born in Oud-Turnhout
 Karel Van Miert, politician, European Commissioner

Gallery

References

External links

 

Municipalities of Antwerp Province
Populated places in Antwerp Province